Gheorghe Derussi (January 3, 1870 – December 10, 1931) was a Romanian politician who served as the Minister of Foreign Affairs of Romania from December 17, 1921 until January 19, 1922 under the reign of Romanian King Ferdinand of Romania.

Prior to becoming the minister, Derussi was the first Romanian envoy plenipotentiary to Stockholm appointed on April 1, 1917. On May 1, 1917, Derussi was also accredited to Oslo and Copenhagen, where Romanian diplomatic missions opened simultaneously.

See also
Foreign relations of Romania

References

Romanian Ministers of Foreign Affairs
1870 births
1931 deaths